In enzymology, an imidazolonepropionase is an enzyme that catalyzes the chemical reaction

(S)-3-(5-oxo-4,5-dihydro-3H-imidazol-4-yl)propanoate + H2O  N-formimidoyl-L-glutamate + H+

Thus, the two substrates of this enzyme are (S)-3-(5-oxo-4,5-dihydro-3H-imidazol-4-yl)propanoate and H2O, whereas its two products are N-formimidoyl-L-glutamate and H+.

This enzyme belongs to the family of hydrolases, those acting on carbon-nitrogen bonds other than peptide bonds, specifically in cyclic amides.  The systematic name of this enzyme class is 3-(5-oxo-4,5-dihydro-3H-imidazol-4-yl)propanoate amidohydrolase. Other names in common use include 4(5)-imidazolone-5(4)-propionic acid hydrolase, and imidazolone propionic acid hydrolase.  This enzyme participates in histidine metabolism.

Structural studies

References

 
 

EC 3.5.2
Enzymes of known structure